Elson do Rosario Almeida (born 23 June 1990, in Lissabon) is a Portuguese professional footballer who plays as a right back, most recently for BVV Barendrecht in the Dutch Tweede Divisie.

Personal life
Almeida was born in Portugal and is of Cape Verdean descent.

References

External links

1990 births
Living people
Footballers from Lisbon
Portuguese footballers
Portuguese sportspeople of Cape Verdean descent
FC Emmen players
Excelsior Maassluis players
BVV Barendrecht players
Eerste Divisie players
Tweede Divisie players
Derde Divisie players

Association football midfielders